James, Jim,  or Jamie Mayer may refer to:

James W. Mayer (1930–2013), American applied physicist 
James Mayer (spy) (1920–1944),  Mauritian secret agent during World War II
Jim Mayer (musician) (born c. 1961), American guitarist, singer-songwriter, and producer
James Erskine Mayer (1889–1957), American baseball player with the Philadelphia Phillies, the Pittsburgh Pirates, and the Chicago White Sox
Jamie Mayer (born 1977), Scottish former professional rugby player 
Jim Mayer (ice hockey) (born 1954), Canadian ice hockey player

See also
James Mayer de Rothschild (1792–1868), German-French banker and the founder of the French branch of the Rothschild family
Mayer (name)
James Meyer (disambiguation)
James Myer (born 1951), American filmmaker